Daura is the surname of:

 Lawal Musa Daura (born 1953), Director General of the Nigerian State Security Service beginning in 2015
 Pierre Daura (1896-1976), Spanish-born French painter
 Sani Daura, Nigerian Minister of Agriculture and Rural Development (1999-2000) and Minister of Environment (2000-2001)